The 42nd parallel north is a circle of latitude that is 42 degrees north of the Earth's equatorial plane. It crosses Europe, the Mediterranean Sea, Asia, the Pacific Ocean, North America, and the Atlantic Ocean.

At this latitude the sun is visible for 15 hours, 15 minutes during the summer solstice and 9 hours, 6 minutes during the winter solstice.

The earth's rotational speed at this latitude is roughly equal to the speed of sound.

Around the world

Starting at the Prime Meridian and heading eastwards, the parallel 42° north passes through:

{| class="wikitable plainrowheaders"
! scope="col" width="125" | Co-ordinates
! scope="col" | Country, territory or sea
! scope="col" | Notes
|-
| 
! scope="row" | 
| Passing near Laluenga and Laperdiguera (Huesca province)
|-
| style="background:#b0e0e6;" | 
! scope="row" style="background:#b0e0e6;" | Mediterranean Sea
| style="background:#b0e0e6;" |
|-
| 
! scope="row" | 
| Island of Corsica
|-
| style="background:#b0e0e6;" | 
! scope="row" style="background:#b0e0e6;" | Mediterranean Sea
| style="background:#b0e0e6;" | Tyrrhenian Sea
|-
| 
! scope="row" | 
| Passing just north of Rome and through Termoli
|-
| style="background:#b0e0e6;" | 
! scope="row" style="background:#b0e0e6;" | Mediterranean Sea
| style="background:#b0e0e6;" | Adriatic Sea
|-
| 
! scope="row" | 
|
|-
| 
! scope="row" | 
|
|-valign="top"
| 
! scope="row" |  or 
| Kosovo is a partially recognised state. Some nations consider its territory to be part of Serbia.
|-
| 
! scope="row" | 
| Passing through Skopje
|-
| 
! scope="row" | 
|
|-
| 
! scope="row" | 
|
|-
| 
! scope="row" | 
|
|-
| 
! scope="row" | 
| For about 300 m
|-
| 
! scope="row" | 
| For about 100 m
|-
| 
! scope="row" | 
| For about 500 m
|-
| 
! scope="row" | 
|
|-
| style="background:#b0e0e6;" | 
! scope="row" style="background:#b0e0e6;" | Black Sea
| style="background:#b0e0e6;" |
|-
| 
! scope="row" | 
|
|-
| style="background:#b0e0e6;" | 
! scope="row" style="background:#b0e0e6;" | Black Sea
| style="background:#b0e0e6;" |
|-
| 
! scope="row" | 
|
|-
| style="background:#b0e0e6;" | 
! scope="row" style="background:#b0e0e6;" | Black Sea
| style="background:#b0e0e6;" |
|-
| 
! scope="row" | 
|
|-
| 
! scope="row" | 
| Dagestan - For about 2 km
|-
| 
! scope="row" | 
| For about 3 km
|-
| 
! scope="row" | 
| Dagestan just south of Derbent
|-
| style="background:#b0e0e6;" | 
! scope="row" style="background:#b0e0e6;" | Caspian Sea
| style="background:#b0e0e6;" |
|-
| 
! scope="row" | 
|
|-
| 
! scope="row" | 
|
|-
| 
! scope="row" | 
|
|-
| 
! scope="row" | 
|
|-
| 
! scope="row" | 
|
|-
| 
! scope="row" | 
|
|-
| 
! scope="row" | 
|
|-
| 
! scope="row" | 
|
|-
| 
! scope="row" | 
|
|-valign="top"
| 
! scope="row" | 
| Xinjiang  Gansu  Inner Mongolia
|-
| 
! scope="row" | 
|
|-valign="top"
| 
! scope="row" | 
| Inner Mongolia Hebei Inner Mongolia Hebei Inner Mongolia  Hebei  Inner Mongolia  Liaoning  Inner Mongolia  Liaoning  Jilin
|-
| 
! scope="row" | 
| Passing through Heaven Lake on Baekdu Mountain
|-
| 
! scope="row" | 
| Jilin (for about 8 km)
|-
| 
! scope="row" | 
|North Hamgyeong Province - Kaema Plateau - Passing just north of Cheongjin   Passing just south of Raseon 
|-valign="top"
| style="background:#b0e0e6;" | 
! scope="row" style="background:#b0e0e6;" | Sea of Japan
| style="background:#b0e0e6;" | Passing just south of Okushiri Island, 
|-
| 
! scope="row" | 
| Island of Hokkaidō
|-
| style="background:#b0e0e6;" | 
! scope="row" style="background:#b0e0e6;" | Pacific Ocean
| style="background:#b0e0e6;" |
|-
| 
! scope="row" | 
| Island of Hokkaidō
|-
| style="background:#b0e0e6;" | 
! scope="row" style="background:#b0e0e6;" | Pacific Ocean
| style="background:#b0e0e6;" |
|-valign="top"
| 
! scope="row" | 
| Oregon / California border Oregon / Nevada border Idaho / Nevada border Idaho / Utah border Wyoming Nebraska Iowa - passing through Cedar Rapids Illinois - passing through the campus of Loyola University in Chicago
|-
| style="background:#b0e0e6;" | 
! scope="row" style="background:#b0e0e6;" | Lake Michigan
| style="background:#b0e0e6;" |
|-
| 
! scope="row" | 
| Michigan - passing through Tecumseh
|-
| style="background:#b0e0e6;" | 
! scope="row" style="background:#b0e0e6;" | Lake Erie
| style="background:#b0e0e6;" |
|-
| 
! scope="row" | 
| Ontario - passing through Point Pelee National Park
|-
| style="background:#b0e0e6;" | 
! scope="row" style="background:#b0e0e6;" | Lake Erie
| style="background:#b0e0e6;" |
|-valign="top"
| 
! scope="row" | 
| Pennsylvania (Erie County) New York / Pennsylvania border New York Connecticut - running just south of the border with Massachusetts Rhode Island - running just south of the border with Massachusetts Massachusetts
|-
| style="background:#b0e0e6;" | 
! scope="row" style="background:#b0e0e6;" | Cape Cod Bay
| style="background:#b0e0e6;" |
|-
| 
! scope="row" | 
| Massachusetts (Truro, Cape Cod)
|-
| style="background:#b0e0e6;" | 
! scope="row" style="background:#b0e0e6;" | Atlantic Ocean
| style="background:#b0e0e6;" |
|-
| 
! scope="row" | 
| Oia (province of Pontevedra, Galicia)
|-
| 
! scope="row" | 
| Valença (Viana do Castelo District)
|-
| 
! scope="row" | 
| Entrimo (province of Ourense, Galicia)
|-
| 
! scope="row" | 
| Lerma, Province of Burgos (Castile and León)
|}

United States

The parallel 42° north forms most of the New York–Pennsylvania border, although due to imperfect surveying in 1785–1786, this boundary wanders around on both sides of the true parallel. The area around the parallel in this region is known as the Twin Tiers.

The 42nd parallel became agreed upon as the northward limit of the Spanish Empire by the Adams–Onís Treaty of 1819 with the United States, which established the parallel as the border between the Viceroyality of New Spain of the Kingdom of Spain and the western territory of the United States of America from the meridian of the headwaters of the Arkansas River west to the Pacific Ocean. The Treaty of Guadalupe Hidalgo of 1848 then ceded much of what was then northern Mexico to the United States; as a result, the northernmost U.S. states which were created from Mexican territory (California, Nevada, and Utah) have the parallel 42° north as their northern border, and the adjoining U.S. states of Oregon and Idaho have the parallel as their southern border.

The parallel passes through the states of Wyoming, Nebraska, Iowa, Illinois, Michigan, Pennsylvania, New York, Connecticut, Rhode Island and Massachusetts, and passes through (or near - within three-tenths degree of latitude) the following cities in the United States:

Crescent City, California 
Yreka, California
Hartford, Connecticut 
Ames, Iowa
Chicago, Illinois 
Kalamazoo, Michigan
Coldwater, Michigan 
Erie, Pennsylvania
Jamestown, New York
Busti, New York
Binghamton, New York
Plymouth, Massachusetts
Springfield, Massachusetts
Worcester, Massachusetts
Foxborough, Massachusetts
Ashland, Oregon
Medford, Oregon
Providence, Rhode Island
Brookings, Oregon

Canada

The parallel 42° north passes through the southern end of Lake Michigan and Lake Erie. Part of the water boundary between Canada and the United States passes south of the 42nd parallel. The southern tip of the Canadian province of Ontario just barely goes south of it at Point Pelee and Pelee Island, while the southernmost portion of the Town of Essex at Colchester is located below the 42nd parallel.

See also
41st parallel north
43rd parallel north
 The Twin Tiers region of New York and Pennsylvania
 The "Jefferson" region of Oregon and California

References

n42
Borders of Oregon
Borders of California
Borders of Nevada
Borders of Utah
Borders of Idaho
Borders of New York (state)
Borders of Pennsylvania